ADP-ribosylation factor GTPase-activating protein 3 is a protein that in humans is encoded by the ARFGAP3 gene.

The protein encoded by this gene is a GTPase-activating protein (GAP) which associates with the Golgi apparatus and which is thought to interact with ADP-ribosylation factor 1 (ARF1). The encoded protein likely promotes hydrolysis of ARF1-bound GTP, which is required for the dissociation of coat proteins from Golgi-derived membranes and vesicles. Dissociation of the coat proteins is a prerequisite for the fusion of these vesicles with target compartments. The activity of this protein is sensitive to phospholipids. This gene was originally known as ARFGAP1, but that is now the name of a related but different gene.

References

External links

Further reading